Silt is a type of soil or earth material.  

Silt may also refer to:
Silt, California, community in Kern County
Silt, Colorado, town in the United States
Silt elimia, type of gastropod
Silt (album), an album by Mistle Thrush
Silt (video game), a videogame by Fireshine Games

See also
Silt'e language, Semitic language spoken in Ethiopia